"Made for Lovin' You" is a song written by Sonny Throckmorton and Curly Putman. First appearing on Dan Seals' 1990 album On Arrival, it was also recorded by Clinton Gregory on his album Music 'n Me. Gregory's version of the song was released as a single, but did not chart.

In 1993, Doug Stone included the song on his album From the Heart for Epic Records. Stone's version was a Top Ten country music hit in 1993, peaking at number 6 on Hot Country Singles & Tracks.

Chart performance 
"Made for Lovin' You" debuted at number 57 on the U.S. Billboard Hot Country Singles & Tracks for the week of February 27, 1993.

Charts

Weekly charts

Year-end charts

References

1993 singles
Dan Seals songs
Doug Stone songs
Songs written by Sonny Throckmorton
Songs written by Curly Putman
Epic Records singles
Song recordings produced by Doug Johnson (record producer)
Clinton Gregory songs
1990 songs